No. 92 Squadron RSAF is a squadron of the Royal Saudi Air Force that operates the McDonnell Douglas F-15S Strike Eagle from King Abdulaziz Air Base, Dhahran.

References

92